Philip's Church (Danish: Filips Kirke) is a Church of Denmark parish church on Amager in Copenhagen, Denmark.

History

The first Philip's Church was a wooden structure built in connection with the establishment of Philip's Parish which was disjoined from the Parish of Sundby on 19 October 1907. It was replaced by the current church which was completed in 1924 to a design by  Danish architect Rasmus Vilhelm Rasmussen Rue (1863-1944).  The congregation house (menighedshuset), which is attached to the church, was added in 1928.

Architecture
The church is built in a traditional style inspired by Danish village churches.

Interior
The altarpiece is a painting in a gilt carved frame by Danish artist Erik Jensen (1883-1974). The pulpit has gospel reliefs by M. Sørensen. Above the west entrance is a tympanon relief designed by Johan Rudolf Carl Nielsen (1863-1952). The inscription quoting the words of Philip the Apostle to Nathanael in John 1:45: "Come and see".

Cultural references
In the fifth episode of the DR television series Huset på Christianshavn, Der bydes til bryllup (1970), Karla (Kirsten Walter) and Egon (Willy Rathnov) are married in the church.

References

External links

 

Lutheran churches in Copenhagen
20th-century Church of Denmark churches
Amager
Churches completed in 1924
Churches in the Diocese of Copenhagen